The Diocese of Isiolo is a Latin Church ecclesiastical territory or diocese of the Catholic Church in the Eastern Province, Kenya.

Its episcopal see is in Isiolo, where the St. Eusebius Cathedral is located.

History 

The Apostolic Vicariate of Isiolo (Vicariatus Apostolicus Isiolansus) was created on 15 December 1995 on territory split off from the Diocese of Meru in Eastern Province, Kenya.

On February 15, 2023, Pope Francis elevated the vicariate to the Diocese of Isiolo and appointed Anthony Ireri Mukobo as its first bishop.

Statistics 
As per 2014, the vicariate pastorally serves 49,800 Catholics (34.8% of 143,294 total) on an area of 25,605 km², in 13 parishes and a mission with 22 priests (16 diocesan, 6 religious), 55 lay religious (9 brothers, 46 sisters) and 12 seminarians.

Episcopal ordinaries
Apostolic Vicars of Isiolo 
 Luigi Locati (born Italy) (15 Dec 1995 – death 14 July 2005 fatally shot during an attempted robbery), Titular Bishop of Zica (15 Dec 1995  – 14 Jul 2005)
Apostolic Administrator John Njue (2005 – January 25, 2006), while Metropolitan Archbishop of Nairobi (Kenya) (6 Oct 2007 – ...), created Cardinal-Priest of Preziosissimo Sangue di Nostro Signore Gesù Cristo (24 Nov 2007 [17 Feb 2008] – ...)
 Anthony Ireri Mukobo, Consolata Missionaries (I.M.C.) (first native incumbent) (25 January 2006 – 15 February 2023), Titular Bishop of Rusguniæ (22 Dec 1999 – ...); previously Auxiliary Bishop of Archdiocese of Nairobi (Kenya) (22 Dec 1999  – 25 Jan 2006).Bishops of Isiolo''
 Anthony Ireri Mukobo, (15 February 2023  present)

See also 
 List of Catholic dioceses in Kenya

References

External links 
 GCatholic, with Google satellite photo - data for all sections
 

Roman Catholic dioceses in Kenya
1995 establishments in Kenya
Christian organizations established in 1995